Aframomum laxiflorum is a species in the ginger family, Zingiberaceae.  It was first described by Ludwig Eduard Loesener and renamed by John Michael Lock.

Range
Aframomum laxiflorum is native to Tanzania in the Uluguru and Uzungwa Mountains.

References 

laxiflorum